Narayanganj-3 is a constituency represented in the Jatiya Sangsad (National Parliament) of Bangladesh from 2014 by Liyakot Hossain Khoka of the Jatiya Party.

Boundaries 
The constituency encompasses Sonargaon upazilas.

Members of Parliament

References

External links
 

Parliamentary constituencies in Bangladesh